El Profesor erótico is a 1976 Argentine film.

Cast
 Osvaldo Pacheco
 Beatriz Bonnet
 Alberto Anchart Jr.
 Thelma Stefani
 Atilio Marinelli
 Susy Kent
 Linda Peretz
 Cecilia Rossetto
 Nelly Beltrán
 Vicente Rubino
 Augusto Codecá
 Carlos Rotundo
 Lelio Lesser
 Claudia Gard
 Héctor Bartolomé
 Juan Carlos Lima
 Miguel Paparelli
 Adrián Noya

External links
 

1976 films
Argentine comedy films
1970s Spanish-language films
1970s Argentine films